Phyllonorycter iranica is a moth of the family Gracillariidae. It is known from Iran.

The length of the forewings is about 4 mm.

The larvae feed on Malus domestica. They mine the leaves of their host plant. The mine has the form of a very small mine on the underside of the leaf.

References

iranica
Moths of the Middle East
Moths described in 1979